Herman Nattkämper (4 October 1911 – 2 April 2005) was a German football player and was German champions in 1934 and 1935.

Born in Gladbeck, he became a member of a local football club when he was 14. Being criticized due to a failed penalty, he left his club and joined the FC Schalke 04. After 76 games and 27 goals he stopped playing football. During World War II he came into Russian war captivity where he started playing football again. Additionally, Hermann Nattkämper was the last living member of the legendary ´Schalker Kreisel´, a special tactic in football, to which Ernst Kuzorra and Fritz Szepan belonged likewise.

1911 births
2005 deaths
People from Gladbeck
Sportspeople from Münster (region)
German footballers
People from the Province of Westphalia
FC Schalke 04 players
Association football defenders
Footballers from North Rhine-Westphalia
German prisoners of war in World War II held by the Soviet Union